Caitlin Aileen Rooskrantz (born 5 November 2001) is a South African artistic gymnast who competed at the 2020 Olympic Games. She won the uneven bars competitions at the 2018 African Artistic Gymnastics Championships, the 2019 FIG Artistic Gymnastics World Cup series event in Szombathely and the 2022 FIG Artistic Gymnastics World Cup series event in Cairo.

Career
Rooskrantz is a member of Johannesburg Gymnastics Centre, and started gymnastics at the age of eight. Between 2015 and 2017, Rooskrantz dislocated her fingers on five separate occasions. In 2016, she came second in the junior all-around event at the African Artistic Gymnastics Championships. At the 2016 Junior Commonwealth Games in Namibia, Rooskrantz came second in the vault event, third in the bars event, and second in the all-around event. Rooskrantz made her senior debut at the 2017 Koper Challenge Cup, finishing fifth in the uneven bars event. She was not selected for the 2018 Commonwealth Games, due to fitness concerns. In 2018, she won the uneven bars event at the African Artistic Gymnastics Championships, and the all-around event at that year's South African National Championships. As a result of her national championship win, Rooskrantz qualified for the 2018 World Artistic Gymnastics Championships in Doha, Qatar. That year, she also participated in a training camp in Frankfurt, Germany.

In 2019, she won the uneven bars Artistic Gymnastics World Cup Challenge event in Szombathely, Hungary. She was the first South African to win a medal at an international gymnastics competition. At the 2019 World Artistic Gymnastics Championships, Rooskrantz qualified for the all-around event at the 2020 Summer Olympics. She was the fourth South African artistic gymnast to qualify for the Olympics since South African re-introduction in 1992, and was the first South African artistic gymnast to qualify for the Olympics since Zandre Labuschagne in 2004. Rooskrantz was one of the first person of colour artistic gymnasts to represent South Africa, along with Naveen Daries, who also competed at the Games. As the 2020 Summer Olympics were delayed due to the COVID-19 pandemic, Rooskrantz livestreamed the routine that she would have performed at the Games in August 2020. She finished 61st in the qualifying stage of the event, and did not qualify for any apparatus final; her score at the Games was a personal best.

Rooskrantz won a gold medal on the uneven bars at the 2022 World Cup event in Cairo, Egypt. She also won the uneven bars event at the 2022 African Artistic Gymnastics Championships. She came third in the uneven bars event at the 2022 Commonwealth Games. She also finished 9th in the final of the individual all-around event, and 12th in qualification for the women's floor event, and did not qualify for the final. She was also part of the South African team that finished fourth in the artistic team all-around event.

Personal life
Rooskrantz attended Parktown High School for Girls. She comes from an athletic family: her father played football and her older brother was involved in field hockey and cricket. Her father died when she was eight. Her mother gave up working full-time as a nurse to support Rooskrantz's gymnastics career. Rooskrantz had planned to have a gap year to focus on competing at the Olympics, though those plans were changed due to the COVID-19 pandemic. She is openly queer, and is the first female artistic gymnast to compete at the Olympics while being publicly out.

References

External links

2001 births
Living people
South African female artistic gymnasts
Sportspeople from Johannesburg
LGBT gymnasts
South African LGBT sportspeople
Gymnasts at the 2020 Summer Olympics
Olympic gymnasts of South Africa
21st-century LGBT people
21st-century South African women
Gymnasts at the 2022 Commonwealth Games
Commonwealth Games bronze medallists for South Africa
Commonwealth Games medallists in gymnastics
Medallists at the 2022 Commonwealth Games